William Gerard Nahorodny (born August 31, 1953), is a retired professional baseball player who played in the Major Leagues from -. A  catcher, he played for the Philadelphia Phillies, Chicago White Sox, Atlanta Braves, Cleveland Indians, Detroit Tigers, and Seattle Mariners.

Nahorodny attended Hamtramck High School in Hamtrack, Michigan. He then played baseball for St. Clair County Community College and was drafted by the Phillies in the 6th round (123rd overall) of the 1972 amateur draft. He made his major league debut on September 27, 1976, going 1-for-3 in a Phillies win over the St. Louis Cardinals. He was claimed off waivers by the Chicago White Sox on September 8, 1977, and played in a career high 107 games with Chicago in 1978.

Nahorodny was later a part-time player with the Atlanta Braves, Cleveland Indians, Detroit Tigers, and Seattle Mariners. He made his final major league appearance on September 25, 1984, collecting one RBI for Seattle in a loss to the Indians. He played AAA ball with the Portland Beavers before retiring after the 1985 season.

In 308 games over nine seasons, Nahorodny posted a .241 batting average (203-for-844) with 74 runs, 41 doubles, 3 triples, 25 home runs, 109 RBIs and 56 bases on balls. Defensively, he recorded a .983 fielding percentage.

He currently resides in Dunnellon, Florida.

References

External links

1953 births
Living people
Major League Baseball catchers
Baseball players from Michigan
Philadelphia Phillies players
Chicago White Sox players
Seattle Mariners players
Atlanta Braves players
Cleveland Indians players
Detroit Tigers players
Rocky Mount Phillies players
Águilas Cibaeñas players
American expatriate baseball players in the Dominican Republic
Salt Lake City Gulls players
Auburn Phillies players
Reading Phillies players
Oklahoma City 89ers players
Evansville Triplets players
Portland Beavers players
Charleston Charlies players
Toledo Mud Hens players